The TM 1131 "Туляк" (Ru:Tula) or "Мишка" (Ru:Mishka "Bear") is a compact economy car developed by JSC "Mishka-Tula-Moscow" (Rus:Мишка-Тула-Москва)  a subsidiary of ZiL.

It is envisaged that with bodies: wagon, van and pickup truck. Construction: supporting metal space frame with plastic body panels.

The TM 1131 uses components and assemblies of the GAZ Gazelle, VAZ Oka, ZAZ Tavria and VAZ.

The TM 1131 visually reminiscent of the VAZ Oka.

Specifications
Body Types: 2-doors. Van, 2-doors. Pickup, 3-dv. Hatchback
Engine: MeMZ (Ukrainian Melitopol) 4-cylinder, V - 1299 injector
power - 1.2L with 64 hp or 1.3L with 70 hp,
fuel - petrol RON 92 - RON 95, EURO-3
Mass and dimensions
Length: 3330 mm
Width: 1575 mm
Height: 1442 mm
Ground clearance: 185 mm
Wheelbase: 2280 mm
Max. speed: 130 km/h
Fuel consumption: 5.8 L per 100 km

See also
 VAZ Oka
 APAL Stalker,  a similarly manufactured SUV

References

External links
Official site of the Tula (Russian)
The Bear low budget people's car (Russian)

Cars of Russia